A glossary of terms relating to automotive design.

Some terms may be found at car classification.

0–9

 One-box form A categorization based on overall form design using rough rectangle volumes.  In the case of the one-box,  also called a monospace or monovolume, it is a single continuous volume.  Slight wedge formed front or rear are still generally placed in this category.  E.g. buses and the original Ford Econoline. The equivalent French term is volume, which will sometimes be used by the British: "1-volume form".

Two-box form A categorization based on overall form design using rough rectangle volumes.  In the case of the two-box form, there is usually a "box" representing a separate volume from the a-pillar forward and second box making up the rest.  E.g., Station wagon, shooting-brake, Scion xB (2006). The equivalent French term is volume, which will sometimes be used by the British: "2-volume form".

Three-box form A categorization based on overall form design using rough rectangle volumes. In the case of the three-box form, there is a "box" delineating a separate volume from the a-pillar forward, a second box comprising the passenger volume, and third box comprising the trunk area—e.g., a Sedan. The equivalent French term is volume, which will sometimes be used by the British: "3-volume form".

A

A-line The line running over the car, from headlight to taillight, tracing the car's silhouette.

B

Backlight Rear glass panel.

Beltline A demarcation or crease between a vehicles body panels and the side windows. Typically it refers to where an individual wears a belt attached to trousers.

Batsman's crease A tangent break feature line running along the centreline of a car. This kind of feature can be seen on many modern Vauxhall, Opel and Chrysler models. Literally derived from the break found on the rear side of a cricket bat.

Bezel The trim or bodywork that surrounds a light, holds the face of an instrument in position, or decoratively conceals gaps between bodywork and components as an escutcheon. Often chrome or plastic

Binnacle The housing for the instrument cluster on top of or as part of the dashboard.

Bonnet The body panel of the vehicle that covers the engine. Typically a horizontal surface, hinged at the cowl, but sometimes hinged at the headlights instead. Also known as a hood.

Boot The trunk or liftgate of the vehicle that opens for access to the cargo area. Typically at the rear of the vehicle.

Brightwork Anything reflective added to a car to enhance appearance. May also be called chrome.

BiW Body in White. Base chassis before customisation.

Butterfly doors A type of door sometimes seen on high-performance cars. They are similar to but distinguished from scissor doors by their hinge point. While scissor doors move straight up via hinge points at the bottom of the A-pillar, butterfly doors move up and out via hinges along the A-pillar.

Bustle back First seen on the second generation Cadillac Seville, this was a short lived design trend. Inspired by the English coachbuilder Hooper & Co.'s "Empress Line" designs from the early 1950s, these were a unique take on trunk-body integration allowing for a shortened trunk and a rakish rear end.

C

Cab Short for cabin. The enclosed compartment of a vehicle which contains the driver and passengers.

Cab back The cab of the vehicle is moved to the rear of the vehicle.  Cars such as a 1970s Corvette could be considered cab back design.

Cab forward The cab of the vehicle is pushed forward.  This design aesthetic was popular with Chrysler in the 1990s with the introduction of their LH platform cars.

Carrosserie Bodywork of a vehicle. Also the workshop at which automotive body work is built on a prototype or low volume production basis, typically with extensive handwork.

Character line A line creased into the side of a car to give it visual interest.  (interchangeable with swage line) Sometimes implemented by a rubbing strip.

Chrome Brightwork using chrome plating.

Cladding Material (usually plastic) added to exterior of the car which isn't structurally necessary. May be functional to keep out dirt/debris as in underbody cladding, or may be cosmetic.

Control panel Generally used in a car or truck for heating and cooling inside car environment according to the passenger requirements. Basically it is divided into different modes, blower speed functions, AC, temperature, and fresh recirculation of air. Worldwide control panel manufacturers are BHTC, Delphi, Visteon, Valeo, etc.

Cowl The base of the windshield.

D

Dagmar bumpers A slang term for chrome conical shaped styling elements which began to appear on the front bumper/grille assemblies of certain American automobiles following World War II. The term is derived from the notable physical attributes of Dagmar, a buxom early 1950s television personality known for low-cut gowns and pronouncedly conical bra cups. 

US DOT Term: For openings on the side of the vehicle, other than a door opening, the locus of all points where a horizontal line, perpendicular to the vehicle longitudinal centerline, is tangent to the periphery of the opening.
US DOT Term: For openings on the front and rear of the vehicle, other than a door opening, daylight opening means the locus of all points where a horizontal line, parallel to the vehicle longitudinal centerline is tangent to the periphery of the opening.

Daytime Running Lamp (DRL) A daytime running lamp (DRL, also daytime running light) is an automotive lighting and bicycle lighting device on the front of a roadgoing motor vehicle or bicycle,[1] automatically switched on when the vehicle is in drive, emitting white, yellow, or amber light. Their job isn't to help the driver see the road but to help other road users see the vehicle.

Dash-to-Axle (ratio) The critical relationship between front wheel centers and the windshield base. The most notable differences can be seen between cars with front-engine, front-wheel drive layout and front mid-engine, rear-wheel drive layout: the former tend to have longer front overhangs with a smaller dash-to-axle ratios, while the latter have shorter front overhangs with much greater dash-to-axle. Most so called premium vehicles (equipped with rear wheel drive) feature a relatively long dash-to-axle ratio.

Deck The horizontal surface at the rear of the car, which usually serves as the trunk lid.

Dog leg The area behind the rear door on a four-door car. This area is part of the quarter panel just behind the door and in front of the rear wheel house.

Down the Road Graphics (DRG) The styling of the front end of the car, which people will instantly recognize and associate with a manufacturer. For example, the grille, lights and sometimes the DLO.

Droptop A convertible.

F
Fairing An external structure added to increase streamlining, deflect wind, and reduce drag.

Fascia The body-skin panel at the front of the car.

Fastback A car body style whose roofline slopes continuously down at the back found on cars with a single convex curve from the top to the rear bumper.

Fender (wings, UK) Term for cowl covering the wheels of the vehicles.  In more modern automobiles, this refers generally to the body panel or panels starting at the front "bumper" to the first door line excluding the engine hood.  The opposite of the fender is the "quarter panel".

Fishtail Exhaust A car or motorcycle exhaust tip with the sides forming a tapering design- either horizontal or vertically aligned - often made to look like the tail of a fish . "Koenigsegg Regera" uses a modern example of this design. These were made popular in the 1920's by their implementation in the Brooklands silencer which were necessitated by the noise regulations at the Brooklands race track.

Frame-on-rail Also known as body-on-frame. A design used in older (pre-unibody) cars, trucks, and SUVs. The power train and body are mounted to a rigid structural vehicle frame, also known as a rail, and the body is a distinct structure that is mounted to the frame. In some cases, the distinction between a body-on-frame and unibody construction are blurred; for example, subframes could be used to carry suspension components, or the body could be a separate module, such as the case of the BMW i3.

G

Gill A vent on the side of the fender that can be used as hot-air outlet, but usually decorative.

Greenhouse The glassed-in upper section of the car's body.  Daylight Opening (DLO) in turn describes the actual window areas only.

Gull-wing door Car doors that are hinged at the roof rather than the side, as pioneered by the 1952 Mercedes-Benz 300SL race car. Opening upwards, the doors evoke the image of a seagull's wings.

H

Hardtop A coupe or sedan lacking a center window post between the front windshield post and the rearmost window post or body section.

Header The structural roof beam above the windshield. Alternatively, header can refer to the section of exhaust piping attached to the cylinder head.

Hofmeister kink BMW's trademark reverse-sweep kick at the bottom of last roof pillar.

H-point (or HP (Hip Point)) The pivot point between the torso and upper leg portions of the body, either relative to the floor of the vehicle[1] or relative to the height above pavement level, as used in vehicle design.

Hood The engine cover on vehicles when the engine is located forward or aft of the passenger compartment. Also known as a  bonnet in English speaking countries outside North America with the exception of the Canadian Maritimes

HVAC Heater, ventilation and air condition. A major package constraint both technically as well in interior design.

I

IP Instrument Panel. The dashboard is termed the instrument panel in the automotive industry. Sometimes this term is confused with the instrument cluster, the group of speedometer, odometer and similar devices generally behind the steering wheel.

K

Kammback A car body style that calls for a body with smooth contours that continues to a tail that is abruptly cut.

L

Leafscreen Plastic clips onto the base of the windscreen under the bonnet to protect from leaves and flowers.

Leafscreen retainer Bonded to the base of the windscreen to provide a mounting surface for the leafscreen

N
 
NACA duct A distinctively shaped inlet that is flush and begins with a narrow, shallow inset and becomes progressively wider and deeper. The duct was developed to introduce cooling air into aircraft engine nacelles, while increasing the drag of the nacelle only minimally. The duct was developed at the National Advisory Committee for Aeronautics (NACA).

O

Overhang The distance the car's body extends beyond the wheelbase at the front (front overhang) and rear (rear overhang). In car style design terms, this is the amount of body that is beyond the wheels or wheel arches. In general, the sum of the front and rear overhangs is equal to the overall length minus the wheelbase. Typically, the rear overhang is larger on rear-wheel drive cars, while the front overhang is larger on front-wheel drive cars.

Obscuration band Black graphite printed onto the glass to hide unsightly areas and improve aesthetics.

P
Phaeton An open vehicle, usually with 4 doors, with a removable and/or retractable cloth top and a windshield characterized by the lack of integrated glass side windows. Contemporary uses of this name do not always follow this original description or apply to an open vehicle.

Pillar A structural member that connects the roof to the body of the car. Pillars are usually notated from front to back alphabetically (e.g. the A-pillar joins the windshield to the frontmost side windows, the B-pillar is next to the front occupants' heads, etc.).

An imaginary line extending from the base of the A-pillar and following its angle will pass in front of the front axle for most front-wheel drive and mid-engined cars, while it will pass through or behind the front axle for most rear-wheel drive cars. Pulling the A-pillar forward increases cabin volume, but the car will tend to assume a  shape and the A-pillar position may interfere with the driver's vision.

The C-pillar usually is the last structural pillar in most  forms. Its angle and position defines the split between cargo volume and rear-seat passenger volume and headroom. In general, the base of the C-pillar is located over the rear wheel arch in most sedans (saloons) and coupes.

US DOT Term: Means any structure, excluding glazing and the vertical portion of door window frames, but including accompanying molding, attached components such as safety belt anchorages and coat hooks, that (1) supports either a roof or any other structure (such as a roll-bar) above the driver's head or (2) is located along a side edge of a window.

Plenum The area at the base of the windshield where the wipers are parked. Also refers to the main chamber in an intake manifold.

Ponton styling  A 1930s–1960s design genre when distinct running boards and fully articulated fenders became less common and bodywork began to enclose the full width and uninterrupted length of a car in a markedly bulbous, slab-sided fashion.

Plug-in hybrid electric vehicle A hybrid vehicle that can be plugged into the electric grid to recharge its battery to reduce gasoline usage.

Powertrain All the components that generate power and deliver it to the tyres.

Q
Quarter-panel (or rear quarter panel) refers to the panel at the back sides starting at the rear edge of the rearmost doors, bordered by at top by the trunk (boot) lid and at bottom by the rear wheel arches ending at the rear bumper. This is the opposite of the fender.
Literally, the term originally referred to the rear quarter or the car's length.

R

Rake The first application of the term rake in vehicles was probably the tilting back of the windshield's top. Nowadays rake refers to the angle between the overall vehicle and the horizontal axis of the ground. If the back is higher than the front, the vehicle is said to have positive rake; if the front is higher than the back, this is negative rake. In early hot rod and custom cars, positive rake was created by varying tire size, and/or by suspension modification. In today's body design, positive rake is integral in some vehicles' styling, e.g. Mercedes E350 sedan, circa 2012/13.

Roadster An open vehicle, usually with 2 doors, with a removable and/or retractable cloth top and a windshield characterized by the lack of integrated glass side windows. Contemporary uses of this name do not always follow this original description. A classical roadster is a two-seater with a long hood and a short back, which means the driver is sitting in the rear of the vehicle (close to the rear axle). Usually it is a rear-wheel-driven car.

Rocker The body section below the base of the door openings sometimes called the "rocker panels", or s.

Rocker rail Body armor protecting the Rocker, found mostly in off-road vehicles. Term coined by engineers at MetalCloak.

Rubbing strip Plastic/rubber line or moulding to prevent side-swiping along the doors.

S

Saab hockey stick The hockey stick is an automotive design feature seen on nearly all Saab automobiles. It refers to the curve formed by the C-pillar in the rear corner at the base of the rear passenger window, which resembles the shape of an ice hockey stick or the Nike swoosh symbol.

Scissor doors (Lamborghini doors) are automobile doors that rotate vertically at a fixed hinge at the front of the door, rather than outward as with a conventional door.

Scoop Inset or protrusion that implies the intake of air. May be functional for cooling/ventilation or purely ornamental. When mounted directly to the engine and allowed to protrude through the hood/bonnet, known as a shaker scoop as it vibrates in response to the throttle.

Scowling headlamps Headlamps styled along a V-shape as viewed from the front, giving the impression of a scowl.

Scuttle The part of the body on a convertible or roadster where the windscreen is mounted. The term is used primarily in the UK. 

Shooting-brake  Once a vehicle designed to carry hunters and sportsmen; now a station wagon or vehicle combining features of a station wagon and a coupe.

Shoulder line The line or "shoulder" formed by the meeting of top and side surfaces extending from hood/fender shoulder to boot-lid/quarter-panel shoulder.  The strongest example of this feature can be found on more modern of Volvo Cars.

Sill The body section below the base of the door openings sometimes called the "rocker panels", or "rockers".

Sill line Imaginary line drawn following the bottom edge of the greenhouse glass.

Six line A line extending from the C-pillar down and around the rear wheel well.

Sixthlight Also called quarter glass; fixed glass located in between the side-door and boot.

Softtop A convertible top which is made out of flexible materials like PVC or textile.

Spats Side covers for wheel arches, hiding the wheel—usually rear only. Also called fender skirts.

Spoiler A raised lip or wing which is used to "spoil" unfavorable air movement across the body. Some designs are more functional than others.

Staggered wheel fitment The front and rear wheels are different widths.  On sporty rear-wheel-drive cars, the rear tires are usually wider than the front.

Strake Crease in the sheet metal intended as a "speed line" styling feature.  Exemplified in the doors of the Ferrari Testarossa.

Suicide door Side doors hinged at the rear of the car with the latch at the front of the car. If accidentally opened while driving at a high speed, such doors would be blown backward.

Swage line Crease or curvature in the side of the body used to create visual distinction. Sometimes the crease is functional and improves rigidity of the outer body (interchangeable with character line).

Swan doors Swan doors operate in a similar way to conventional car doors but unlike regular doors, they open at an upward angle. These help to prevent the bottom edges of doors on low cars from scraping on curbs. Common on Aston Martin cars.

Swedish kiss A negative flick-out to a flat surface which frames trim sections or venting.

T
Track The distance across the car between the base of the left and right wheels (like wheelbase, but side-to-side).

Truck A typically large vehicle built using frame-on-rail construction consisting of a cab and a separate bed for cargo.

Trunk (Boot in UK) Compartment for storage of cargo which is separate from the cab.

Tube Fender Replacement fenders found on off-road vehicles designed as part of body armor for off-road vehicles. Used to protect the thin sheet metal bodies from damage while off-roading.

Tumblehome Generally refers to the way the sides of a car rounds inward toward the roof, specifically of the greenhouse above the beltline.  This term is borrowed from nautical description of naval vessels.

Turn under The shape of the rocker panel as it curves inward at the lower edge.

W
Wedge Shape of the car as seen in the side profile. May be positive, negative or neutral. If the front is lower than the rear, then it is wedge-positive. If the rear is lower it is wedge-negative. If the car appears level from front to rear, then it is wedge neutral.

Wheel arch The visible opening in the side of a car allowing access to the wheel.

Wheel arch gap The space between the tire and the wheel well. Currently there is a trend towards smaller wheel arch gaps.  Sometimes referred to as Dead Cat Space due to the fact that, in winter, many domestic cats try to seek shelter in wheel wells of recently parked cars in an attempt to stay warm.

Wheelbase The distance measured along the vehicle's length between the centrelines of each axle, which may be approximated from where the front and rear wheels meet the ground. Cars have typical proportions that have a wheelbase of approximately three wheel diameters (±) between the wheels, giving a wheelbase that is approximately four times the outer diameter of the wheel and tire.

Wheel well (also wheelhouse, wheelhousing, or bucket) The enclosure or space for the wheel.

Windshield trim US DOT Term: Molding of any material between the windshield glazing and the exterior roof surface, including material that covers a part of either the windshield glazing or exterior roof surface.

See also
 Car body style
 Car classification
 Glossary of mechanical engineering

References

Automotive industry
Automotive design
design
Wikipedia glossaries using description lists